The Dragon was an event on the 2012 Vintage Yachting Games program at Lake Como,  Italy. Five out of the nine scheduled race were entered. 39 sailors, on 13 boats, from 9 nations entered.

Race area and Course

Of the three Campo's (Race Area's) available for the 2012 Vintage Yachting Games at Lake Como Campo Alpha was used for the Dragon event. In general this Campo is situated in North of Dervio.

For the 2012 edition of the Vintage Yachting Games three different courses were available. The Dragon could use only course 2.

Wind conditions 

The Northern part of Lake Como was reportedly a thermic wind venue. In this time of year the normal situation is that at about 13:00 the Swiss mountains are heated up and a Southern wind hits the racing areas with about 10 to 14 knots. As result of this no races were scheduled in the morning. Unfortunately during the event the temperature in Switzerland were low. Also was the thermal South breeze battling with the gradient wind from the North. As result the actual wind did not came above the 8 knots during the races and was instable at times.

Campo Alpha has normally a tendency to have a slightly higher wind speed than Campo Charlie this due to the fact that it is more Northern than Charlie so that the Southern thermal breeze is strengthened.

Races

Summary 
In the Dragon five out of the planned nine races were completed.

The Dragon class (Olympic between 1948 – 1972) had her first competitor from Africa ever. The South African (RSA) team did reasonably good with an eight place overall.
The Dutch team of Reinier Wissenraet, Pim ten Harmsen van der Beek, Marc Reijnhoudt also the defending champion came in on second place. Bronze was taken by Vasiliy Senatorov, Igor Ivashintsov, Alex Muzichenko from Russia. But the gold was for the Ukrainian team of Yevgen Braslavetz, Georgii Leonchuk, Sergey Timokhov.

Results 

 dnc = did not compete
 dns = did not start
 dnf = did not finish
 dsq = disqualified
 ocs = on course side
 ret = retired after finish
 Crossed out results did not count for the total result.

Daily standings

Victors

Notes

References 
 

Dragon